"I Belong to You" is a song recorded by Australian singer Gina G from her debut album, Fresh! (1997). It was released on 28 October 1996 as the follow-up to "Ooh Aah... Just a Little Bit" and was her first release to be produced by Metro, who would produce the majority of her singles. Written by her with Bill Colbourne, it spent two weeks in the UK top 10, peaking at number six and spending a further 9 weeks in the top 75 (and a further 9 weeks in the top 200). The single also was a top 20 hit in Denmark, Finland, Ireland and Mexico. Gina G performed "I Belong to You" in various TV-shows, like Top of the Pops and WOW!.

Critical reception
British magazine Music Week rated "I Belong to You" four out of five, complimenting it as "hugely catchy dance pop." The reviewer added, "It is unlikely to get as much exposure as her Eurovision contender, but deserves to be a smash." Pop Rescue stated that the song followed "Ooh Aah... Just a Little Bit" "perfectly as it is fairly similar in sound", noting that it "really gallops along, with a chugging fat synth line as Gina's vocals sit flawlessly on top. This is a lovely dance pop song." A reviewer from Sunday Mirror described it as "high energy".

Chart performance
"I Belong to You" proved to be a major hit on several continents. In Europe, it was a top 10 hit in Iceland, Scotland and the UK. In the latter, it went straight to number six in its first week at the UK Singles Chart, on 3 November 1996. But on Music Weeks on a Pop Tip Club Chart, it peaked at number-one. Additionally, the single was a top 20 hit in Denmark, Finland and Ireland, and a top 30 hit in Sweden. On the Eurochart Hot 100, it hit number 37. Outside Europe, it was successful in Israel, peaking at number eight and reaching the top 20 in Mexico. "I Belong to You" also charted in Canada, reaching number 21 on the RPM Dance/Urban chart and in Australia, where it peaked at number 34.

Music video
A music video was made for "I Belong to You", featuring Gina G dressed as a genie in a lamp. It was directed by directors Max Giwa and Dania Pasquini, known as just Max & Dania.

Track listings

 UK: CD Maxi (WEA081CD) "I Belong to You" (Radio Edit) – 3:19
 "I Belong to You" (12" Extended Mix) – 5:46
 "I Belong to You" (Hysteric Ego Vocal Mix) – 6:11
 "I Belong to You" (Matt Darey Mix) – 6:56
 "I Belong to You" (Phat 'N' Phunky Club Mix) – 7:42
 "I Belong to You" (Hysteric Ego Dub) – 6:11

 UK: Limited Edition CD Maxi (WEA081CDX)'
 "I Belong to You" (Radio Edit) – 3:19
 "Ooh Aah... Just a Little Bit" – Eurovision Version) – 3:02
 "Ooh Aah... Just a Little Bit" – Karaoke Version) – 3:02
 Gina Interview – 14:06

Other versions:
 "I Belong to You" (DJ Tonka's Expect The Unexpected Mix) – 7:28 (from UK promotional 12")

Charts

Weekly charts

Year-end charts

References

1996 singles
1996 songs
Gina G songs
Music videos directed by Max & Dania